Iringal  is a village in Kozhikode district in the state of Kerala, India.

History
The famous son of Iringal, Kunjali Marakkar, went on to become the trusted admiral and commanded the Zamorins fleet and thwarted the efforts of Portuguese vessels trying their best to make a landing on the Kerala coast. The birthplace of this valiant admiral of the Zamorin is situated on the southern bank of the Mooradi River. Today, Keralites remember his valor and selfless service rendered for his motherland with lot of reverence. The Department of Archaeology took over his birthplace for preserving and also to give an opportunity for generations to come and pay respect to one of Kerala's valiant sons.

Demographics
 India census, Iringal had a population of 24318 with 11593 males and 12725 females.

Sargalaya Craft Village
Iringal Craft Village managed by tourism department of Kerala, inaugurated on Sunday Nov,14,2010 is one of the major tourist attractions in Iringal.
This facility was built by the government of Kerala for allowing local artisans to showcase their products.  They also sell their products at fair prices.  Visiting foreigners can learn some skills of craft making from the horses' mouth.  This facility is built in a 20-acre plot at Iringal on the shores of kutiady river.  There are 60 stalls for sale and exhibition of handicrafts.  The villages displays products made of fibre, bamboo, coir, sand, coconut, palm and pine.

Transportation
Iringal village connects to other parts of India through Vatakara city on the west and Kuttiady town on the east.  National highway No.66 passes through Iringal and the northern stretch connects to Mangalore, Goa and Mumbai.  The southern stretch connects to Cochin and Trivandrum.  The eastern Highway  going through Kuttiady connects to Mananthavady, Mysore and Bangalore. The nearest airports are at Kannur and Kozhikode.  The nearest railway stations are Iringal, Payyoli and vatakara railway stations

See also

 Thottilpalam
 Madappally
 Villiappally
 Memunda
 Payyoli
 Orkkatteri
 Iringal railway station

References

Vatakara area